David Avery (born 6 April 1986) is a British film, television and theatre actor.  He is best known for The Night Manager, Starred Up and Lost in London.

Background 

Avery was born 6 April 1986 in Birmingham England, son of Cypriot parents. He attended Baverstock Secondary School in Druids Heath, Birmingham until 2002. After graduating Avery relocated to London with his immediate family. In 2007 he auditioned for the Central School of Speech and Drama and earned a place on the MA Acting for Screen course.

Career 
Avery's first on screen role came in 2009 by starring in the third series of Sofia's Diary.  He joined the lead cast as Flex featuring throughout the series. Sofia's Diary, produced by Sony Television, was one of the first online web series to make the transition to UK television. Avery's first feature film part was in Fit written and directed by Rikki Beadle-Blair. Shortly after, Avery landed the part of Nicos in The Inbetweeners Movie. The film went on to break UK box office records for the opening weekend. In 2012 Avery took part in the June edition of Monologue Slam UK. Actors take to the stage to compete against each other by performing monologues to a professional industry panel. Avery won first prize for his performance, "The monologue that David performed captivating the room was 'Nowhere in America' by Bathsheba Doran".

Avery is also notable for playing lead character Marcus Graham in the multi-award-winning web-to-television series Brothers With No Game. The series amassed a huge international following when the first episode was released online in June 2012. Avery and the cast later returned for a second series with the public demand being so high and winning six awards at the LA Web Festival 2013. The show’s popularity got the attention of London Live and went on to be broadcast in 2014. The lead cast of the show also went on to win Favourite Web Series Ensemble at the first ever Screen Nation Digital-iS awards.

Avery's television work continued when he joined the cast of CBBC's The Dumping Ground. Avery played Kingsley Jackson alongside Victoria Alcock. The family were a popular addition to the first series, so much so they were asked to return to the show for a Christmas Special episode, “Jody in Wonderland”. The series went on to win a BAFTA that year for Best Drama. His next major role was landing the part of Ashley in feature film Starred Up opposite Jack O'Connell and Ben Mendelsohn. The film received excellent reviews ("Raw and Immediate" – Variety) and 4/5 stars from Empire magazine. The film was directed by David Mackenzie and went on to win various awards including Best Feature Film at BAFTA Scotland 2014.

His career gained momentum in 2016 with a stand out performance as Freddie Hamid in the BBC/AMC series The Night Manager. The British-American production is based on the 1993 novel of the same name by John le Carré. The series was directed by Susanne Bier and the lead cast included Tom Hiddleston, Hugh Laurie and Olivia Colman. The series won two Primetime Emmy Awards and three Golden Globes.

Later that year Avery joined the lead cast of Borderline, a retro-scripted comedy series following the work of UK Border Force staff at the fictional Northend Airport. Avery received a number of positive reviews for his performance as Agent Tariq Mansour. The Guardian wrote – "For instance, there's border agent Tariq, a failed DJ and one of characters who succeeds in injecting genuine humour into his part with subtle timing and a good line in kill-me-now-I-hate-my-life facial expressions."

In 2017 Avery starred in Lost in London opposite Woody Harrelson and Owen Wilson. It was the first film ever to broadcast live into movie theatres worldwide as it was shot in real time.  The film was captured in one take using 24 shooting locations and included car and foot chase scenes.

Deadline announced in December 2022 that Avery would be joining the cast of MGM+’s and Sky's second season of Domina playing the role of Domitius.

Filmography

Television

Film

Awards 

Screen Nation Digital-iS Awards – Favourite Web Series Ensemble – Brothers With No Game

LA Web Festival 2013 – Brothers With No Game – Winner Outstanding Ensemble David Avery, Jay Marsh, Zephryn Taitte and Isaac Sosanya.

Monologue Slam UK – June 2012 Champion

References

External links 

1986 births
Living people
Male actors from Birmingham, West Midlands
21st-century English male actors
English male film actors
English male television actors
English male stage actors